Timothy Brown (born October 25, 1984) is an American former professional football player who was a running back and kick returner in the Canadian Football League (CFL). He signed with the BC Lions in 2011 and won his first Grey Cup championship that same season. In 2012, he was named a West Division All-Star and the West Division's Most Outstanding Special Teams Player. Brown played for four years with the Lions before he was released. He played college football for the Temple Owls.

Professional career

Billings Outlaws
After going undrafted, Brown signed with the Sioux City Bandits in 2008. He would later be traded to the Billings Outlaws. He played for three seasons with the Outlaws, winning two Indoor Football League championships in 2009 and 2010.

BC Lions
Brown originally signed as a free agent with the BC Lions on May 17, 2011. Brown was named a West Division all-star at the end of 2012 season, and was second in the CFL with 2,687 all-purpose yards, which included 2,382 kick return yards (ninth-highest total in CFL history), 914 punt return yards (second most in the CFL in 2012), third in kickoff return yards (1,303) and fourth in missed field goal return yards (165). Brown's single-season all-purpose yards was also the second-highest total in franchise history, after Ian Smart's 2,744 yards in 2008.

In December 2012, he signed a one-year contract extension. In total, Brown played in 52 regular season games for the Lions with 3,987 kick return yards and a kick return touchdown and 2,404 punt return yards and four punt return touchdowns. After four seasons with the team, he was released by the Lions on May 25, 2015.

Calgary Stampeders
On June 16, 2015, Brown signed with the Calgary Stampeders. He played with the team for one year before being released on January 12, 2016.

References

External links
Calgary Stampeders bio
BC Lions bio

1984 births
Living people
African-American players of Canadian football
American players of Canadian football
Billings Outlaws players
BC Lions players
Calgary Stampeders players
Canadian football running backs
Sioux City Bandits players
Temple Owls football players
21st-century African-American sportspeople
20th-century African-American people
Players of American football from Stockton, California
Players of Canadian football from Stockton, California